Abandoned is the fourth studio album by American melodic hardcore band Defeater. Abandoned is a concept album, following the story of the Catholic priest in the song "Cowardice" from Travels. This album is
Defeater's first release with Epitaph Records. They went on tour in support of the album, supported by Four Year Strong, Expire, Superheaven, Speak Low If You Speak Love, My Iron Lung, and Elder Brother. Derek Archambault was quoted, "[Abandoned] is the overall way that this character feels, be it by this god that he never really believed in, but took a leap for, to pay back this man that saved his life, or be it self-inflicted, where he leaves the woman he loves but takes it out on himself emotionally and through drug abuse. The title itself is the overall feeling of the record." Abandoned was written and recorded after Archambault underwent hip surgery. Archambault used the time to "redouble his connection with his own writing, leaving him clear to truly inhabit what he calls his own Glass family—after the famous J.D. Salinger characters."

Reception

Abandoned received positive reviews from critics. On Metacritic, the album holds a score of 79/100 based on 7 reviews, indicating "generally favorable reviews."

Track listing

Personnel

Defeater 
Derek Archambault – lead vocals
Jay Maas – guitar, backing vocals
Jake Woodruff – guitar
Mike Poulin – bass
Joe Longobardi – drums

Production 
Jay Maas – recording, mixing at Getaway Recording Studios
Brad Boatright – mastering at Audio Siege
Daniel Florez – additional engineering
Michael Winters, Alyssa Archambault – photography
Derek Archambault, Alyssa Archambault, Michael Winters – art direction
Jason Link – design

References

Defeater (band) albums
Epitaph Records albums
2015 albums